Àlíì Ọ̀chẹ́ja  Ọ̀bàje   GCFR (1910 – July 16, 2012) was the 26th Àtá Igala (paramount ruler) of the Igala Kingdom in Nigeria. Obaje reigned for 56 years making him one of the longest serving monarch in Nigeria's history.

Life and kingship
Born in 1910, Aliyu Obaje was the youngest person to be installed ah Àtá Ígáláà; he mounted the stool at the age of 36 on November 2, 1956 following the death of his predecessor Ameh Oboni I. Obaje ruled for 52 years before he died at the age of 102. The Àtá's palace (the seat of power in the Igala Kingdom) is located in the ancient city of Idah.

He was one of the longest-serving monarchs in Nigeria. He has conferred on a large population of the Igala people traditional chieftaincy titles, including the title of Agenyi-Àtá of Igala Kingdom, bestowed on Chief Ogwu J. Onoja, SAN. Aliyu Obaje was the chairman of the Kogi State council of Traditional chiefs. He held the Nigerian national honour of GCFR (Grand Commander of the Federal Republic).

Demise
He died on July 16, 2012.

References

2012 deaths
Nigerian traditional rulers
1920 births